Fanconi anemia group G protein is a protein that in humans is encoded by the FANCG gene.

Function 

FANCG, involved in  Fanconi anemia, confers resistance to both hygromycin B and mitomycin C. FANCG contains a 5-prime GC-rich untranslated region characteristic of housekeeping genes. The putative 622-amino acid protein has a leucine-zipper motif at its N-terminus.  Fanconi anemia is an autosomal recessive disorder with diverse clinical symptoms, including developmental anomalies, bone marrow failure, and early occurrence of malignancies. A minimum of 8 FA genes have been identified. The FANCG gene is responsible for complementation group G.

The clinical phenotype of all Fanconi anemia (FA) complementation groups is similar.  This phenotype is characterized by progressive bone marrow failure, cancer proneness and typical birth defects.  The main cellular phenotype is hypersensitivity to DNA damage, particularly inter-strand DNA crosslinks.  The FA proteins interact through a multiprotein pathway.  DNA interstrand crosslinks are highly deleterious damages that are repaired by homologous recombination involving coordination of FA proteins and breast cancer susceptibility gene 1 (BRCA1), but the exact biochemical roles of these proteins is currently unclear.

A nuclear complex containing FANCG (as well as FANCA, FANCB, FANCC, FANCE, FANCF, FANCL and FANCM) is essential for the activation of the FANCD2 protein to the mono-ubiquitinated isoform.  In normal, non-mutant, cells FANCD2 is mono-ubiquinated in response to DNA damage.  Activated FANCD2 protein co-localizes with BRCA1 (breast cancer susceptibility protein) at ionizing radiation-induced foci and in synaptonemal complexes of meiotic chromosomes (see Figure: Recombinational repair of double strand damage).

Meiosis

Activated FANCD2 protein may function prior to the initiation of meiotic recombination, perhaps to prepare chromosomes for synapsis, or to regulate subsequent recombination events.

Male and female FANCG mutant mice have defective gametogenesis, hypogonadism and impaired fertility, consistent with the phenotype of FA patients.  In the non-mutant mouse, FANCG protein is expressed in spermatogonia, preleptotene spermatocytes and spermatocytes in the leptotene, zygotene and early pachytene stages of meiosis.

Aging

Loss of FANCG causes neural progenitor apoptosis during forebrain development, likely related to defective DNA repair. (Sii-Felice et al., 2008).  This effect persists in adulthood leading to depletion of the neural stem cell pool with aging.  The FA phenotype can be interpreted as a premature aging of stem cells, DNA damages being the driving force of aging. (Also see DNA damage theory of aging).

Interactions
FANCG has been shown to interact with FANCF,

FANCA, FANCE and BRCA2.

References

Exterlal links

Further reading